Leo Edward Larrivee (November 23, 1903, in Fall River, Massachusetts – October 7, 1928, in Chicago, Illinois) was an American track and field athlete. Larrivee won a bronze medal at the 1924 Summer Olympics in Paris. He was a middle distance runner at the College of the Holy Cross. He died in a traffic collision in 1928.

References

External links
 

1903 births
1928 deaths
American male long-distance runners
American male middle-distance runners
Athletes (track and field) at the 1924 Summer Olympics
Olympic bronze medalists for the United States in track and field
Sportspeople from Fall River, Massachusetts
Medalists at the 1924 Summer Olympics
Road incident deaths in Illinois